Empire State VII is an under-construction troop ship of the United States Navy and training vessel for the United States Maritime Service.  It is the first vessel in the National Security Multi-Mission Vessel (NSMV) class and is anticipated to replace the 1961-built Empire State VI. The new training ship will be the seventh vessel to carry the name Empire State for the SUNY Maritime College but its first purpose-built new build.  The previous training ships had been converted cargo or military vessels.  

The NSMV design was developed by the Herbert Engineering Corp. of Alameda, California. While primarily a training ship the NSMV class is also to be equipped for disaster relief: a Roll-on/Roll-off side ramp, container space and crane, and a helipad.

The contract for the first two NSMV vessels was signed  with Philly Shipyard (Philadelphia, Pennsylvania) in April 2020 with anticipated delivery in Spring of 2023. Steel cutting for the first vessel began in December 2020. Its keel was laid on 10 December 2021 and launched on 24 September 2022.

References 

Training ships of the New York State Merchant Marine Academy
Transports of the United States Navy
Training ships of the United States